Kuri, also spelt Korri, is a village located in the Islamabad Capital Territory of Pakistan.

References

Union councils of Islamabad Capital Territory